Ouderkerkerlaan  is a tram stop within the city of Amstelveen, Netherlands. The stop lies along tram line 25, which was dubbed the Amsteltram before it received its line number. It opened officially on 13 December 2020, unofficially 4 days earlier on 9 December.

Ouderkerkerlaan was earlier a stop for metro line 51, a hybrid metro/sneltram (light rail) service that opened in 1990. Like a metro, the sneltram used high-level platforms. Metro line 51 service south of Amsterdam Zuid station was closed in 2019 to rebuild stations with lower platforms to accommodate the new low-floor trams for line 25.

References

External links
GVB website 
Tram stops in Amsterdam
Railway stations opened in 2004